Dato Barbakadze; born 7 February 1966) is a Georgian writer, essayist and translator.

Biography 
Dato Barbakadze was born in Tbilisi. He studied philosophy and psychology in Tbilisi State University between 1984 and 1992 and holds a Masters degree in Philosophy. In 1992-1994 he pursued his post-graduate studies in the Department of Sociology at Tbilisi State University, but left a standard academic career to pursue independent projects in Georgian and German literature: he has followed a non-traditional academic path for the past twenty years (2010). In 1991 Dato Barbakadze founded a literary video-magazine Dato Barbakadze’s Magazine, which for two years was regularly performed at Tbilisi State University. He also founded the literary magazines Polilogue (1994, four issues) and ± Literature (1996, four issues). These publications featured many of the innovations of Georgian literature in the 1990s. From 1991 to 2001 Dato Barbakadze taught courses in logic, the history of philosophy, esthetics and introductory philosophy courses in several universities in Tbilisi. In 2002-2005 he lived in Germany where he pursued his literary interests and studied philosophy, ancient history and sociology at Westphalian Wilhelms-University of Münster. After returning to Tbilisi in 2005 Dato Barbakadze started the project XXth century Austrian Poetry, serving both as an editor and contributor. Dato Barbakadze has been a member of Die Kogge, an association of European writers, since 2007. His works have been translated into English, German, French and Russian. He lives in Tbilisi, Georgia.

Published works 
(Georgian titles in parentheses)

Poetry:
Condolences to Fall (მივუსამძიმროთ შემოდგომას). Tbilisi 1991.
Longing for Logic (ლოგიკის მონატრება). Tbilisi 1993, .
Putting the Question (საკითხის დასმა). Tbilisi 1994, .
One minute or One Life Before the Journey (გამგზავრებამდე ერთი წუთით ან ერთი სიცოცხლით ადრე). Tbilisi 1994, .
Roofbuilder (მხურავი). Tbilisi 1995, .
Negation of the Summary (შეჯამების უარყოფა). Tbilisi 1999, .
Essential Steps (არსებითი სვლები). Tbilisi 2001, .
The Songs of Lake Embankment (ტბის სანაპიროს სიმღერები). Tbilisi 2004, .
Poems 1984–2004 (ლექსები 1984-2004). Tbilisi 2008, .
ars poetica. Tbilisi 2010, .
 In Defense of Memory (მეხსიერების დასაცავად). Tbilisi 2013, .
From a Problematic Light (პრობლემური სინათლის გამო). Tbilisi 2015, .
The window (სარკმელი). Tbilisi 2016, .
Skeptical Etudes (სკეპტიკური ეტიუდები). Tbilisi 2019, .
and so on (და ასე შემდეგ). Seven Haiku Wreaths. Tbilisi 2019, .

Prose:
Mutation (მუტაცია). Novel. Tbilisi 1993.
The second heel of Achilles (აქილევსის მეორე ქუსლი). Novel. Tbilisi 2000, .
Short Prose 1990-2010 (მცირე პროზა 1990-2010). Tbilisi 2010, .

Collected Essays:
Poetry and Politics (პოეზია და პოლიტიკა). Tbilisi 1992.
Resistances Head-On (შემხვედრი წინააღმდეგობები). Tbilisi 1994.
Questions and Social Environment (კითხვები და სოციალური გარემო). Tbilisi 2000, .
Fragmentarium I. Tbilisi 2006, .
Fragmentarium II, III. Tbilisi 2008, .
Fragmentarium IV. Tbilisi 2011, .
Fragmentarium V, VI, VII. Tbilisi 2013, .
Fragmentarium I-VII. Tbilisi 2013, .
Fragmentarium VIII. Tbilisi 2015, .
Reflektions on the German-language poetry of the XX. century. Tbilisi 2015, .
Fragmentarium I-VIII. Tbilisi 2018, .

Letters on Literature:
D/D (დ/დ). Tbilisi 2006, .
Unrealistically (არარეალურად). Tbilisi 2010, .
Continuation (გაგრძელება). Tbilisi 2012, .

Translations (into Georgian):
From XX century German Poetry. Tbilisi 1992.
Collection of European and American Poetry. Volume I. Tbilisi 1992.
Collection of European and American Poetry. Volume II. Tbilisi 1993.
Collection of European and American Poetry. Volume III. Tbilisi 2000, .
Hans Arp: Poems. Tbilisi 1992.
Georg Trakl: Poems. Tbilisi 1999.
Paul Celan: Poems. Tbilisi 2001.
Hans Magnus Enzensberger: Poems. Tbilisi 2002, .
Brita Steinwendtner: Red Pool. Novel. Tbilisi 2005, .
Hans Magnus Enzensberger: Poems from The Language of the Country. Tbilisi 2007, .
XXth Century American Poets. Tbilisi 2008.
Marianne Gruber: I do not know, if I am. Poems. Tbilisi 2008. .
Ernst Meister: Poems. Tbilisi 2009, .
Translated due to circumstances 1989-2010. Tbilisi 2011, .
Banesh Hoffmann: Albert Einstein. Biography. Tbilisi 2012, .
Wladimir Pack, Andrej Baranjuk: Robert Fisher. Biography. Tbilisi 2012, .
 From 20. century German Poetry. Tbilisi 2012, .
Hans Magnus Enzensberger: The Wolves Defended Against the Lambs. Poems. Tbilisi 2013, .
Ernst Meister: Simple Creation. Poems. Tbilisi 2013, .
Georg Trakl: DE PROFUNDIS. Selected Poems. Tbilisi 2014, .
Michael Guttenbrunner: Holy Break. Poems. Tbilisi 2015, .
Wilhelm Szabo: Simultaneity. Poems. Tbilisi 2015, .
Günter Eich: Messages from the Rain. Poems. Tbilisi 2015, .
Norbert Bolz: Who is Afraid of Philosophy? An essay. Tbilisi 2016, .
The Secret of the Pearl. Jesidic Sacred Poetry. Tbilisi 2017, .
Translations 2014-2017. Tbilisi 2018, .
Helmuth A. Niederle: A Holy River. Poems. Tbilisi 2018, .
Nikolaus Lenau: The Distance. Poems. Tbilisi 2018, .
Ilse Aichinger: Verschenkter Rat. poems. Tbilisi 2019, .
 Friedrich Hebbel: The Nibelungs. Der gehörnte Siegfried. Siegfrieds Tod. Tbilisi 2020, ISBN 978-9941-26-686-7.
 Friedrich Nietzsche: Dionysian-Dithyrambs. Tbilisi 2021, ISBN 978-9941-8-3222-2.
 Translations 2018–2021. Tbilisi 2021, ISBN 978-9941-8-3652-7.

Collected works 
Outcomes (შედეგები). Volume I. Mertskuli, Tbilisi 2014. .
Outcomes (შედეგები). Volume II. Mertskuli, Tbilisi 2014. .
Outcomes (შედეგები). Volume III. Mertskuli, Tbilisi 2014. .
Outcomes (შედეგები). Volume IV. Mertskuli Verlag, Tbilisi 2018. .
Outcomes (შედეგები). Volume V. Mertskuli, Tbilisi 2014. .
Outcomes (შედეგები). Volume VI. Mertskuli, Tbilisi 2014. .
Outcomes (შედეგები). Volume VII. Mertskuli, Tbilisi 2019. .
Outcomes (შედეგები). Volume VIII. Mertskuli, Tbilisi 2014. .
Outcomes (შედეგები). Volume IX. Mertskuli, Tbilisi 2014. .

Works in another language

In German 
Das Dreieck der Kraniche. Gedichte. Pop, Ludwigsburg 2007, .
Die Poetik der folgenden Sekunde. Poesie und Prosa. Drava, Klagenfurt 2008, .
Wesentliche Züge und zwölf andere Gedichte. Mischwesen, Neubiberg 2010, .
Die Leidenschaft der Märtyrer. SuKulTur, Berlin 2012, .
Die Unmöglichkeit des Wortes. Theoretische Manifestationen. Pop, Ludwigsburg 2016, .
Meditation über den gefallenen Baum. Gedichte. Löcker, Wien 2016. .
Das Gebet und andere Gedichte. Pop, Ludwigsburg 2018, .
Wenn das Lied sich vom ermüdeten Körper befreit. Gedichte. Pop, Ludwigsburg 2018, .
 Und so weiter. Sieben Haiku-Kränze. Deutsch von Maja Lisowski. Nachdichtung von Theo Breuer. Pop Verlag, Ludwigsburg 2021, ISBN 978-3-86356-322-6.

In English 
Still Life With Snow and Other Poems. Bedouin Books, Port Townsend 2014, .
 Passion of the Martyrs. Universali Publishing House, Tbilisi, Seattle 2017, .

In Russian 
 Разное. Поэзия, проза, эссе. Издательство Meрцкули, Тбилиси 2016, .

Publishing Project Austrian Poetry of the XXth Century (in Georgian) 
Volume I: Hugo von Hofmannsthal, Richard von Schaukal. Saari, Tbilisi 2006, .
Volume II: Georg Trakl. Saari, Tbilisi 2006, .
Volume III: Rainer Maria Rilke. Saari, Tbilisi 2007, .
Volume IV: Anton Wildgans, Albert Ehrenstein, Felix Braun. Saari, Tbilisi 2007, .
Volume V: Franz Werfel, Alexander Lernet-Holenia Polylogi, Tbilisi 2010, .
Volume VI: Josef Weinheber. Polylogi, Tbilisi 2009, .
Volume VII: Alma Johanna Koenig, Paula von Preradović, Erika Mitterer. Polylogi, Tbilisi 2010, .
Volume IX: Theodor Kramer, Ernst Waldinger, Wilhelm Szabo. Samizdat, Tbilisi 2019, .
Volume XI: Paul Celan. Samizdat, Tbilisi 2011, .
Volume XII: Ingeborg Bachmann. Polylogi, Tbilisi 2010, .
Volume XIII: Christine Lavant, Christine Busta. Polylogi, Tbilisi 2008, .
Volume XIV: Hans Carl Artmann. Polylogi, Tbilisi 2008, .
 Volume XV: Ilse Aichinger, Friederike Mayröcker.  Samizdat, Tbilisi 2020, ISBN 978-9941-8-2325-1.

External links 

 
 
 
 
 
 
 
 https://web.archive.org/web/20120415072956/http://www.americancouncils.org/JER/archive2/issue4/8.htm

Academics from Georgia (country)
Philosophy academics
Living people
1966 births